Heinrich Paal (26 June 1895 – 20 September 1942) was an Estonian footballer. He competed in the men's tournament at the 1924 Summer Olympics. He died in a Soviet prison camp during World War II.

References

External links
 

1895 births
1942 deaths
Sportspeople from Rakvere
People from Kreis Wierland
Estonian footballers
Estonia international footballers
Olympic footballers of Estonia
Footballers at the 1924 Summer Olympics
Association football midfielders
Estonian people who died in Soviet detention
People who died in the Gulag